Kent-Are Antonsen (born 12 February 1995) is a Norwegian footballer who plays as a midfielder for Tromsø.

Antonsen was born in Storsteinnes.

Career statistics

Club

References

1995 births
Living people
People from Balsfjord
Norwegian footballers
Norway youth international footballers
Association football defenders
Tromsø IL players
Eliteserien players
Norwegian First Division players
Sportspeople from Troms og Finnmark